Stunning Luxury is the second studio album by English band Snapped Ankles. It was released on 1 March 2019 under The Leaf Label. Described as a "10-song Gang of Four style takedown of modern capitalism" and "a stridently political album that loses neither its sense of humour nor its capacity for bangers", the album's themes and settings are based in the city and suburbs rather than the forests of 2017's Come Play The Trees.

The Quietus placed the album at #16 in their Albums Of The Year 2019.

Track listing

References

2019 albums
The Leaf Label albums